"Palmeras en la nieve" is a song recorded by Spanish singer-songwriter Pablo Alborán for the soundtrack to the Spanish romantic drama film Palmeras En La Nieve. The song was released worldwide on 11 December 2015 and peaked at number 23 in Spain in February 2016.

At the 30th Goya Awards the song was awarded the Goya for Best Original Song.

Chart performance

References 

2015 songs
2015 singles
Pablo Alborán songs
Songs written by Pablo Alborán
Warner Music Spain singles